AANM may refer to:

 A. A. N. M. & V. V. R. S. R. Polytechnic, India
 Arab American National Museum, USA